The Levi Willits House is a historic house located at 202 Main Street in New Boston, Illinois. Levi Willits, a prominent local businessman who ran the city's general store, built the house in 1856. The house has a Greek Revival design, a popular style when it was built. The house's design includes six-over-six windows with flat sills and lintels and a low hip roof, both typical Greek Revival features. The south and northwest corner entrances both feature porches; these porches, along with a since-removed porch on the east side, originally had classical columns and balustrades but were later remodeled.

The house was added to the National Register of Historic Places on April 20, 1995. The New Boston Historical Society operates a local history museum in the house.

References

Houses on the National Register of Historic Places in Illinois
Greek Revival architecture in Illinois
Houses completed in 1856
Houses in Mercer County, Illinois
Historic house museums in Illinois
National Register of Historic Places in Mercer County, Illinois